This is a list of awards and nominations received by American actor, director, producer, and musician Kevin Costner.

Major associations

Academy Awards

British Academy Film Awards

Golden Globe Awards

Primetime Emmy Awards

Screen Actors Guild Awards

Other awards and nominations

Blockbuster Entertainment Awards

Chicago Film Critics Association

Critics' Choice Movie Awards

Critics' Choice Television Awards

César Awards

David di Donatello

Directors Guild of America Awards

Golden Raspberry Awards

Japan Academy Prize

Jupiter Award

MTV Movie & TV Awards

National Board of Review

Palm Springs International Film Festival

San Francisco Film Critics Circle

Satellite Awards

Saturn Award

References

External links
 

Costner, Kevin